Bagisara buxea is a species of moth in the family Noctuidae (the owlet moths). It is found in North America.

The MONA or Hodges number for Bagisara buxea is 9172.

References

Further reading

 
 
 

Bagisarinae
Articles created by Qbugbot
Moths described in 1881